James Randolph Reid (August 11, 1750 – January 25, 1789) was an American soldier in the Revolutionary War. He later served as a delegate for Pennsylvania to the Continental Congress from 1787 until 1789.

Reid was born in Hamilton Township in what was then York County, Pennsylvania. He graduated from the College of New Jersey (now Princeton) in 1775 and joined the Continental Army as a lieutenant. He rose to the rank of major, and was 2nd in command of Congress' Own Regiment.

After the war, Reid was one of the veterans who received a patent or land grant. He took his land in Middlesex Township of Cumberland County, Pennsylvania after his discharge in 1781. This remained his home of the rest of his life.

In 1787, the Pennsylvania legislature named Reid as one of their delegates to the Continental Congress, and he held this honor for three years until his death in 1789.

External links

Continental Congressmen from Pennsylvania
18th-century American politicians
Continental Army officers from Canada
1750 births
1789 deaths